Offadesma angasi is a bivalve mollusc of the family Periplomatidae.

References
 Powell A. W. B., New Zealand Mollusca, William Collins Publishers Ltd, Auckland, New Zealand 1979 
 Glen Pownall, New Zealand Shells and Shellfish, Seven Seas Publishing Pty Ltd, Wellington, New Zealand 1979 

Periplomatidae
Bivalves of Australia
Bivalves of New Zealand
Bivalves described in 1930